František Čermák and Leoš Friedl were the defending champions, but lost in the quarterfinals to Gustavo Kuerten and André Sá.

Lukáš Dlouhý and Pavel Vízner won in the final 6–1, 4–6, [10–3], against Mariusz Fyrstenberg and Marcin Matkowski.

Seeds

Draw

Draw

External links
Draw

Doubles